is a single by Japanese recording artist Alisa Mizuki, featuring Japanese mixture rock band Asian2. It was released on September 28, 2005, nearly two years and a half since Mizuki's last single, "Shout It Out" (2003). The single was issued in two formats: CD+DVD edition and CD-only edition.

The title track was produced by Asian2 and written by the band's two MCs 20 and Tatsu. It served as theme song for the film Tobi ga Kururi to, starring Mizuki herself. CDJournal described "C'est la Vie" as a "lively and cheerful, brassy and rhythmic track about believeing in yourself." The B-side, "Sweet One Week," is a cover of a Koushoku Jinshu song of the same name, from their debut studio album Akarui Mirai Keikaku, and is performed by Mizuki alone.

"C'est la Vie" debuted on the Oricon Weekly Singles chart at number 106 and only charted for one week, selling a total of 880 copies.

Track listing

Charts and sales

References 

2005 singles
Alisa Mizuki songs
2005 songs